Paul Reilly may refer to:

 Paul Reilly (rugby league) (born 1976), British rugby league player
 Paul C. Reilly (1890–1984), American architect (father of Paul Waldron Reilly)
 Paul F. Reilly, Judge of the Wisconsin Court of Appeals
 Paul Waldron Reilly (1932–2011), American architect (son of Paul C. Reilly)
 Paul Reilly (computer scientist), pioneer of virtual archeology and data visualisation in archeology
 Paul Reilly, Baron Reilly (1912–1990), British designer

See also
Paul Riley (disambiguation)